Thomas Christopher Davies (born 18 April 1992) is an English professional footballer who plays as a defender for Tranmere Rovers.

Career
Born in Warrington, England, Davies started his career with local junior side Grappenhall Juniors where he was spotted by Manchester United and Manchester City and invited for trials with both clubs. He subsequently signed for Manchester United as an eight-year-old, where he spent four years at the club as a youth player before he was released in 2005. He later signed for Blackburn Rovers but was released at the age of sixteen having failed to earn a scholarship.

Whilst he was at studying at college he had brief spells at non-league sides Warrington Town and Runcorn Town before being offered a football scholarship at Northumbria University. And cameo Preston Whilst at University he played for Team Northumbria of the Northern Football League Division Two. In his first season with the club he won the League and Cup double, gaining promotion to Division One. He also featured in the 2012 Northumberland Senior Cup final at St James' Park scoring twice in a defeat to Newcastle United Reserves on penalties after a 4–4 draw. After completing his degree in the summer of 2013, he returned home and signed for Northern Premier League Premier Division side FC United of Manchester after impressing on trial.

In March 2014, after impressing with FC United he signed for Football League Two side Fleetwood Town on an eighteen-month contract, and was immediately loaned back to his former club until the end of the season. He made a total 45 appearances for the FC United, scoring five goals. After failing to secure a place in the Fleetwood side, in October 2014 he was loaned to Conference Premier side Alfreton Town on a one-month loan deal. In November 2014 his loan was extended for a further month, in total he made eleven appearances for the club. In February 2015, he was sent out on loan again to the Conference Premier, signing for Lincoln City on a one-month loan deal. However, he failed to make an impact and only made one appearance as a substitute for Sean Newton in a 2–0 defeat to Bristol Rovers. In March 2015, he was sent out again to the Conference Premier, signing for Southport on loan until the end of the season. He made nine appearances for the Sandgrounders helping them avoid relegation to the National League North.

In May 2015, he was released by Fleetwood and signed for Football League Two side Accrington Stanley on a one-year deal. He made his professional debut in August 2015 in the 1–1 draw with Luton Town. He scored his first goal for the club in a 3–2 win at Cambridge United on 21 November 2015.

Coventry City
On 31 August 2017, Davies signed for Coventry City for a nominal fee from Portsmouth, on a two-year deal. Davies made his debut on 2 September 2017 in a 0–0 away draw with Chesterfield, going on to make another 21 league appearances as Coventry reached the play-offs. Davies featured in the first leg of the semi Final in a 1–1 draw with Notts County but failed to appear in the second leg or the final as City beat Exeter City 3–1 in order to return to League One at the first time of asking, securing Davies' second promotion from the division in three seasons.

Bristol Rovers
On 11 June 2019, Davies joined fellow League One side Bristol Rovers as he was out of contract with Coventry that summer. He made his debut on 3 August 2019, in an opening day 2–0 defeat away at Blackpool. He scored his first goal for the club on 12 October 2019 as he impressively volleyed home the only goal of a tight win over Milton Keynes Dons, a win that saw Rovers continue to defy pre-season expectations and go up to 4th in the table. Davies returned to first-team action in January 2020 after missing three months with tendinitis, before Davies had to have surgery on his knee in February 2020, causing him to miss the rest of the season. In July 2020, manager Ben Garner revealed that Davies would most likely be out until early 2021, revealing that he had needed surgery in the other knee. After spending the second half of the 2020–21 season on loan at Barrow, it was announced at the end of the season that Davies would not be having his contract renewed and would be leaving the club after two years.

Barrow (loan)
On 18 January 2021, Davies joined League Two side Barrow on loan until the end of the season in a bid to get first team match action as he made his return from injury. He made his debut on 30 January 2021, playing the first 74 minutes of a 2–1 defeat to Bradford City. Davies' first goal for the club opened the scoring of a vital 3–2 victory over Crawley Town.

Tranmere Rovers
On 9 June 2021, Davies joined League Two side Tranmere Rovers on a free transfer, signing a one-year contract.

Career statistics

Honours
Portsmouth
League Two Champion: 2016–17

Coventry City
League Two Promotion Play-Off Winner: 2018

References

External links
 

1992 births
Living people
Warrington Town F.C. players
Runcorn Town F.C. players
F.C. United of Manchester players
Alfreton Town F.C. players
Lincoln City F.C. players
Southport F.C. players
Accrington Stanley F.C. players
Portsmouth F.C. players
Coventry City F.C. players
Bristol Rovers F.C. players
Barrow A.F.C. players
Tranmere Rovers F.C. players
English Football League players
National League (English football) players
Northern Premier League players
Association football forwards
Footballers from Warrington
English footballers